Panas Myrny (real name is Panas Yakovych Rudchenko, 13 May 1849 - 28 January 1920) was a famous Ukrainian prose writer and playwright writing in Ukrainian language. He wrote in literary realism creating innovative social novels and stories from the life of the people.

Biography

Panas Rudchenko was born in 1849 into a family of an accountant of county treasury in Mirgorod (today – Myrhorod). After several years of studying in a parish school of Myrhorod and a county school of Hadyach, at his fourteen Panas had to earn money for living. In 1863 he worked as a petty official in Hadyach county court. Next year Myrny worked as an accountant assistant in the local county treasury. Later after a brief stint in Pryluky, he continued to work at same position in Myrhorod Treasury.

In 1871 Panas Rudchenko settled in Poltava, where he got the rank of State Councilor at the local government house. Literary activity became the real joy for Panas Myrny. Restless, he was sitting at his desk in the evening and enthusiastically devoted himself to his hobby. Shortly before his death in a letter to J. Zubkovsky he requested not to disclose his name:"Although many of my friends know who is Panas Myrny, but I'm in my lifetime would not want to advertise my name, seriously consider it unworthy of those glorifications, which were created around the name of  Myrny”. Panas Myrnyi founded the "Zirka" publishing house for children in Poltava.

In 1951, at the writer's birthplace in Poltava, a monument was installed in the courtyard of his museum-estate.

Works
Panas Myrny's best-known work is the novel Khiba revut’ voly, yak yasla povni? (Do the Oxen Bellow, When Their Mangers Are Full?), that he coauthored with his brother, Ivan Rudchenko (also known as Ivan Bilyk). The work can be characterized as a sociopsychological novel-chronicle; it covers almost a century in the history of a Ukrainian village, from serfdom to the postreform era. In it Myrny depicts social oppression, internal struggle between various social groups, the tsarist legal system, the stern life of a soldier during the time of Tsar Nicholas I, police violence, and spontaneous protests against lies and injustice. The novel was published in 1880 in Geneva with the help of political emigrant Mykhailo Drahomanov.

Myrny's second important sociopsychological novel, Poviia (The Loose Woman, 1884), describes new social processes caused by the reforms of 1861. Myrny also portrayed the changed social dynamics of the village after the abolition of serfdom in the story Lykho davnie i s'ohochasne (Ancient and Contemporary Evil, 1903) and Sered stepiv (Among the Steppes, 1903).

References

Sources
Encyclopedia of Ukraine

1849 births
1920 deaths
People from Myrhorod
People from Mirgorodsky Uyezd
Ukrainian novelists
Ukrainian dramatists and playwrights
Russian civil servants
Russian accountants
Ukrainian male writers
Male dramatists and playwrights